Jessica Moore and Ellen Perez were the defending champions, but Moore chose to participate at the 2019 St. Petersburg Ladies' Trophy instead. Perez partnered alongside compatriot Arina Rodionova, but lost in the semifinals to Chang Kai-chen and Hsu Ching-wen.

Chang and Hsu won the title, defeating Alexandra Bozovic and Isabelle Wallace in the final, 6–2, 6–4.

Seeds

Draw

Draw

References
Main Draw

Launceston Tennis International - Doubles
Launceston Tennis International